Oxaï Roura is a French composer, multi-instrumentalist, singer, filmmaker, and researcher in the field of ethnomusicology. Fascinated by the ancient African polyrhythms and chants, Oxaï received instruction from traditional masters of music (such as Famoudou Konaté and Mamady Keïta). He produced recordings and performed on stage, during the 1990s and early 2000s, with a variety of bands in different genres.

Discography
In 2003, Oxaï Roura composed and produced his first single "EXU. Atabaques’n bass vol. 1" and his first album named The EXU Experience. Atabaques'n bass. Vol. 1. "EXU that was acknowledged by the Fundaçao Pierre Verger (Bahia/Brazil).

in 2004 Oxaï Roura created the Spiritual Heritage Orkestra. In this band, with the Venezuelan percussionist Gustavo Ovalles (ex-Omar Sosa), Roura mixed Afro-Cuban rhythms and electronic sounds. Roura produced a concert live DVD Spiritual Heritage Part 1: Secrets of Afrika (Live)" distributed in South America only.

In 2008 Oxaï Roura produced a solo CD called "Afro Amazonian Spirit (Naturosophia)". This CD is the first recording of a new musical style Oxaï created and called the Afroamazonika. This brand new style combines tribal rhythms and chants from Africa and South America with strange electronic sounds. Some of the instrumental compositions have been created as soundtracks for original choreographic (created by the Azamiah dance company and the Obatala association) and movies.

In 2010 and 2011, Roura produced Melanesia X''. This album is the original soundtrack created for the "Well'Come!" show performed by the Posuë dance company.
 The whole "Well'come!" show (Music and Dance) has been supported and rewarded by the A.D.C.K NganjilaTjibaou Center, and won the award "Emergences 2010" in New Caledonia!

Films
Oxaï Roura directed and produced the following short movies for Ma Afrika (Academy for African Survival Rebirth and Progress):

2008. Credo Mutwa’s urgent appeal to the world.
2009. Badiredi Ba Lemamoso project.
2010. Credo Mutwa’s new dream (Part 1 and 2).
2013. Songs make people alive!

See also
Electronic music
Afro/Cosmic music
Music of Brazil
Music of Africa
Michael Blake (composer)
Omar Sosa
Steve Coleman

References

External links
 
 
 

French hip hop musicians
Living people
French singer-songwriters
French-language singers
French drummers
Male drummers
French electronic musicians
Year of birth missing (living people)
French male singer-songwriters